George Mortimer Tibbits (December 5, 1796 – July 19, 1878) was an American landowner, livestock farmer, and art connoisseur.

Life 
George Mortimer Tibbits was born in Lansingburgh, New York, on December 5, 1796. He was the eldest child of George and Sarah Noyes Tibbits. About the middle of the year 1797 and when he was about six months old, his parents removed to Troy. He was taught the rudiments of learning at such schools as the village of Troy then afforded, until sent to Lenox, in Berkshire County, Massachusetts, where he received the instructions of a Mr. Gleason, and by him was fitted tor college. Having admitted to Union college, he was graduated thence in 1817. Among his classmates were his cousin, Benjamin Tibbits, of Albany, Joel B. Nott, of Guilderland, Charles F. Ingalls, of Greenwich, and Daniel Gardner, of Troy.

From early childhood Tibbits bad been in feeble health. For the purpose of gaining strength, he had adjusted himself to pedestrianism. After graduating, with the object in view of improving his constitution, he went abroad, and was absent a year. He confined his foreign observations on this occasion mainly to Scotland, which country he explored with much thoroughness, performing most of his journeys on foot. He came back in perfect health, and, as previous to the age of twenty-one had rarely known a well day, so onward from that age until in his seventy-ninth year, he very rarely experienced a day of illness. On his return, he pursued the study of the law for a season in the office of the Hon. John P. Cushman, of Troy. But he was unable to endure the confinement study. He had found that health for him was to be much in the open air, and to pursuits of that nature he afterwards devoted his life.

He soon after purchased the Pfister farm, at Hoosick, which farm had formerly belonged to a loyalist, and which was confiscated during the Revolutionary war. On May 31, 1824, he married Sarah Bleecker, the eldest daughter of John Rutger Bleecker, of Albany, and the niece of Blandina Dudley, who was the wife of Hon. Charles Edward Dudley, at one time a United States senator from New York. After his marriage he removed to Hoosick, and resided there in the old farm house, which in 1880 was still standing, until the brick dwelling, which he was then constructing, was completed. This latter building was remodeled in 1860, and is now a freestone mansion, striking both in design and in appearance. His residence in this city was built in the year 1847, and from the time of his marriage until his death his time was passed partly in Hoosick and partly in Troy.

In the summer of 1866, Tibbits went abroad for the second time, with several members of his family, and was absent for nearly two years. On this occasion he traveled leisurely through Great Britain, France, Germany, Italy, and other countries of Europe, gratifying his taste for art by visiting the principal repositories of works of that character, and occasionally purchasing a specimen of the work of some old master. It was on his return from this tour, in 1868, that he presented to the Troy Young Men's Association the bronze statue of Lincoln which adorned their rooms. This was modeled and cast by F. Miller, Jr. at Munich, in 1868, and was a reduced copy of the statue cast for the city of Chicago.

As the village of Troy grew to be the city of Troy, did Tibbits from a youth grow to manhood. The village became a city in 1816. In the following year Tibbits attained to his majority. He was in no sense a public man, and it is believed that he never held an official position. But he was ever ready to aid in inaugurating good works and in aiding beneficent enterprises. He took a deep interest in the building of a new City Hall, favoring its erection as a needed measure, and laid its corner-stone on November 15, 1875.

Tibbits in appearance was described as "manly, erect, and lean." He was very fond of riding, and until within a few years of his death he would occasionally start off on a stretch of from ten to fifteen miles in the early morning, bestriding his horse with ease and grace.

Always coveting exercise in the open air, the personal attention which he gave to his landed estate in Hoosick afforded him ample opportunity for such exercise, and he was often employed in various kinds of labor incident to the protection and care of his farms. He was also interested in building, "to an extent unequaled probably by any other citizen of Troy", says Sylvester; and during his long life many stores and dwellings were erected under his care.

He early became interested in stock-raising, and several years before the days of herd-books, fancy breeding, and county fairs, was engaged in the importation of a celebrated breed of cattle known as the Teeswater Durham, especially valuable for the dairy. Strains of the blood of this stock were still found in the United States in 1880. He was also a strong advocate of a protective tariff, the development of the resources of the country, and the encouragement of home manufactures. Influenced by these considerations, about the year 1830 he imported a number of Saxony sheep, and originated one of the largest flocks of sheep of that breed in the United States. He was always interested in wool growing and in the improvement of the fleece of sheep, and of its fineness and strength.

Although inclined to gratify a taste for pictures, statuary, antique furniture, and old books, and to surround himself with the evidences of refinement and culture, yet he could not endure waste in any form. He was an advocate for the proper use of things, and was angered by wasteful and ridiculous excess.

His was a practical patriotism. When news of the Rebellion in the South reached the North, and his son, William B. Tibbits, expressed his determination to give his aid in support of the Union as a volunteer, his father not only gave his consent, but aided him pecuniarily and otherwise in raising his company. Later still, when the Griswold Cavalry was organized, of which General Tibbits was the colonel, his father contributed most liberally in procuring enlistments for that regiment in a speedy and efficient manner. His enthusiasm for the cause of the Union was consistent, and not until the Rebellion was subdued did be cease his efforts for its suppression.

In giving he was guided by conclusions reached from examinations and observations made by himself. His benefactions were as unexpected as they were welcome. It was thus, unheralded, that be once gave the sum of $10,000 to the Troy Orphan Asylum; and the present of a dwelling and the appurtenant land to a priest, who a few years ago passed to his reward, is another instance of his philanthropy.

Tibbits, throughout his life, displayed a hatred of all shams and pretense. Directness in any matter with which he was connected was especially to his liking, and in the presentation of any subject to him, he was always desirous that his interlocutor should come to the point at once. Sylvester writes, "He was a stern and an uncompromising foe to gossip, and to the dissemination of scandal or of rumors affecting character or life. He never took up an evil report against any one, and was averse to listening to the details respecting the short-comings of others.

To him the life of home was happiest, and either with his family, or amid his books, were passed his happiest hours. He was particularly fond of the French language, and until his mental faculties began to fail him he read almost daily some of the literature of that nation. He entered the communion of the Episcopal church when a young man, and was always scrupulous in the observances of religious worship. He maintained until his last illness the order of family prayer in his household, and was regular in his attendance thereon whenever the time appointed for the service had come. In the latter part of his life he favored the movement known as the Reformed Episcopal church, which was promulgated by the Rev. Dr. Cummins, and, owing to his evangelical ideas, he readily found fellowship and communion with many bodies of Christians.

His devotional nature found further expansion in the stone church which he erected at Hoosick, and which was in the pastoral care of his son, the Rev. John B. Tibbits. So entirely was he penetrated with the importance of public worship, that he often expressed a belief that great good might be accomplished if a building could be provided devoted to the public service of God and the diffusion of religious knowledge irrespective of any particular creed or form of worship, and open at all proper times for the attendance of the people.

He died in Troy, on Friday, July 19, 1878, at five o'clock in the morning, aged eighty-two years. He left an estate of $2,000,000.

References

Sources 

 Sylvester, Nathaniel Bartlett (1880). History of Rensselaer Co., New York. Philadelphia: Everts & Peck. pp. 89, 192ꜰ–192ɢ. 
 "Death of a Troy Millionaire". The New York Times. July 20, 1878. p. 1.

External links 

 "George Mortimer Tibbits". Find a Grave. April 10, 2016. Retrieved March 13, 2023.
 "George Mortimer Tibbits". Rensselaer County / NYGenWeb. Retrieved March 11, 2023.

1796 births
1878 deaths
Farmers from New York (state)